Bassaniana ora  is a species of spider in the genus Bassaniana, native to Korea.

References

Thomisidae
Spiders described in 1992
Invertebrates of Korea
Spiders of Asia